Sanna Jinnedal (born on 25 April 1993 in Borås) is a Swedish model and Miss World Sweden titleholder. Jinnedal was crowned Miss World Sweden 2012 and represented Sweden at Miss World 2012 in China, placing amongst the Top 30, and she also became Miss World Sportswoman 2012. She additionally represented Sweden at Miss Pearl of Europe 2012 on Cyprus and placed second runner-up.

References

Swedish beauty pageant winners
1993 births
Living people
Miss World 2012 delegates